Sino ang Maysala?: Mea Culpa (International title: Mea Culpa / ) is a 2019 Philippine crime drama television series starring Jodi Sta. Maria, Bela Padilla, Ketchup Eusebio, Tony Labrusca, Kit Thompson, Sandino Martin, and Ivana Alawi. The series premiered on ABS-CBN's Primetime Bida evening block and worldwide via The Filipino Channel from April 29 to August 9, 2019, replacing Halik and replaced by The Killer Bride.

This series is currently streaming on Kapamilya Online Live Global every Thursdays 3:00am-5:00am replacing  The Better Half on the following day (February 2).

Premise
One unfateful night, Juris (Bela Padilla), along with five other lawyers, Drei (Tony Labrusca), Bogs (Ketchup Eusebio), Greco (Kit Thompson), Gaylord (Sandino Martin), and Lolita (Ivana Alawi), accidentally ran over a woman named Barbara (Rubi Rubi) who stole a baby from the hospital. They decided to bury Barbara's body afterwards. Juris took care of the child as her own, under the thought that they killed the child's mother. The real mother, Fina (Jodi Sta. Maria), emerges and is desperate to win her child back. Follow the story of the six lawyers, who would be torn in doing the right thing or disobeying the law they swore to promote.

Cast and characters

Main
 Jodi Sta. Maria as Filipina "Fina" S. Baniaga
 Bela Padilla as Julie Iris "Juris" Miranda / Julie Iris Agoncillo-Montelibano
 Ketchup Eusebio as Ambrosio "Bogs" Bitangcol / Armand Bitangcol
 Tony Labrusca as Andrei Joseph "Drei" Montelibano
 Kit Thompson as Gregorio "Greco" Catapang, Jr.
 Sandino Martin as Gaylord Mamaril
 Ivana Alawi as Lolita del Rio

Supporting
 Janice de Belen as Amor Capuyan
 Agot Isidro as Dolores Miranda
 Ayen Munji-Laurel as Matilda Montelibano
 Boboy Garovillo as Emilio "Emil" Agoncillo
 Jay Manalo as Luciano "Lucio" del Rio
 Maria Isabel Lopez as Maribel Baniaga
 Allan Paule as Gregorio "Gorio" Catapang, Sr.
 Carla Martinez as Celia de Vera
 Leo Rialp as Estelito "Titong" de Vera
 Alvin Anson as Yandro Torres
 Menggie Cobarrubias as Lordivino Mamaril
 Via Veloso as Alice Catapang
 Chiqui del Carmen as Abigail Mamaril
 Iyannah Sumalpong as Joy S. Baniaga/Leyna Montelibano
 Ziljan Ventenilla as Noah S. Baniaga

Guests
 Bernard Palanca as Rommel Baniaga
 Joko Diaz as Ernesto Miranda
 CX Navarro as Rafa Catapang
 Noel Rayos as Dante Gallego
 Precious Espinosa as Christy Villanueva
 Karla Pambid as Atty. Greta Pilapil
 William Lorenzo as Pedring Soliman
 Benedict Campos as Juancho Dela Cruz
 Rubi Rubi as Barbara Villanueva

Production

Development
In September 2018, the drama series was originally titled as Mea Culpa. On the ABS-CBN trade launch in November 2018, the drama series was titled as Mea Culpa: Sino ang Maysala?. On March 18, 2019, the title was reversed into Sino ang Maysala?: Mea Culpa.

Casting
JC Santos was hired to star in this project but later on withdrew.

Broadcast
Sino ang Maysala?: Mea Culpa premiered on April 29, 2019.

Adaptation
An Indonesian adaptation titled Bukan Salah Cinta (produced by Tripar Multi Vision Plus) aired on ANTV from June 22, 2020.

Ratings

Awards and nominations

See also
 List of ABS-CBN drama series

References

External links
 
 iQiyi Official Watching Link

ABS-CBN drama series
Philippine crime television series
Philippine thriller television series
2019 Philippine television series debuts
2019 Philippine television series endings
Television series by Dreamscape Entertainment Television
Filipino-language television shows
Television shows filmed in the Philippines